Erenbağ, formerly and still informally called Şeyhdavut, is a village in the Araban District, Gaziantep Province, Turkey.

References

Villages in Araban District